Pontoetoe was a village in the Sipaliwini District of Suriname, situated on the banks of the Paloemeu River. The village was inhabitated by Wayana Amerindians.

Pontoetoe was visited on 8 November 1904 by the Tapanahony expedition. In 1940 it was reported during an aerial reconnaissance that the village had been abandoned.

References

Former populated places in Suriname
Indigenous villages in Suriname